Still is the sixteenth solo studio album by British singer/songwriter Richard Thompson. It was released by Fantasy Records on 23 June 2015 in the US and by Proper Records on 29 June 2015 in the UK.

Background
The album Still was produced by Wilco's Jeff Tweedy and recorded at Wilco's The Loft Studio in Chicago.  Thompson approached Tweedy as he wished to shake up his approach to making records, stating that "Jeff is musically very sympathetic. Although some of his contributions are probably rather subtle to the listener’s ear, they were really interesting and his suggestions were always very pertinent.”  Tweedy stated that "Richard's been one of my favorite guitar players for a very long time...he's also one of my favorite songwriters and favorite singers".

The album was released digitally, on CD, deluxe CD (including the Variations EP) and vinyl. including 45 rpm 2 disc LP

Critical reception

On the Metacritic website, which aggregates reviews from critics and assigns a normalised rating out of 100, Still received a score of 80, based on 20 positive and 2 mixed reviews. Pitchfork writes that Still "feels extremely present and immediate", calling it "a solid, stark record". Uncut states that Still is Thompson "striving for a modest kind of perfection" and almost achieving it. The Guardian writes that "Thompson is still unique" in their positive review. The Observer note that "Thompson’s resourcefulness shows no sign of waning" on an album they call "characteristically stormy". Rolling Stone write that Thompson has not mellowed with age with songs "still full of dangerous women and treacherous con men". The Independent call Still "a brilliant, nigh-on faultless work from an acknowledged master", stating that "his songwriting, too, is as good here as it’s ever been". Mojo named Still their Album of the Week, writing that "if this was a new act, people would be falling over themselves to sing its praises, but Thompson raised the bar so high so many years ago that this is simply what’s expected of him.

Track listing
All tracks written by Richard Thompson, except "Guitar Heroes" by Thompson and containing interpolations of "Melodie au Crepuscule" by Django Reinhardt, "Caravan" by Juan Tizol and Duke Ellington, "Brenda Lee" by Chuck Berry, "Susie Q" by Stan Lewis, Dale Hawkins and Eleanor Broadwater and "F.B.I." by Hank Marvin, Bruce Welch and Jet Harris.

"She Never Could Resist a Winding Road" — 4:28
"Beatnik Walking" — 3:54
"Patty Don’t You Put Me Down" — 4:30
"Broken Doll" — 3:51
"All Buttoned Up" — 4:07
"Josephine" — 3:24
"Long John Silver" — 4:00
"Pony in the Stable" — 2:44
"Where’s Your Heart" — 4:05
"No Peace No End" — 4:15
"Dungeons for Eyes" — 3:49
"Guitar Heroes" — 7:39

Variations EP (included with the deluxe edition CD)

"Fork in the Road" — 4:26
"Wounding Myself" — 3:58
"The May Queen" — 5:15
"Don't Take it Laying Down" — 6:53
"Fergus Laing" — 4:36

Personnel
 Richard Thompson - vocals, guitar, accordion, ukulele, mandolin
 Jim Elkington - guitar, piano
 Taras Prodaniuk - bass
 Michael Jerome - drums, percussion
 Siobhan Kennedy - harmony vocal
 Sima Cunningham - harmony vocal
 Liam Cunningham - harmony vocal
 Jeff Tweedy - guitar, Marxophone, mellotron, GuitarOrgan, OPI

Charts

References

External links

Richard Thompson (musician) albums
2015 albums
Fantasy Records albums
Proper Records albums
Albums produced by Jeff Tweedy